"Eternal Memories" is Crystal Kay's debut single, released on July 1, 1999. Kay was thirteen years old when this single was released. The title track was written by Yoko Kanno, a well-known Japanese composer and arranger. "Eternal Memories" was first heard in a commercial for "Vitamin Water" and was later recorded in full. Despite peaking at #47, "Eternal Memories" has since become Kay's eighth best selling single.

Track listing 
 Eternal Memories - 5:10
 Fly Away - 4:58
 Fly Away (Acapella) - 4:33 (12" single exclusive)
 Eternal Memories (Instrumental) - 5:07 (12" single exclusive)

Charts 
"Eternal Memories" debuted on the Oricon Singles Chart at #47. It charted for a further four weeks.

References

External links 
 Official Website

1999 debut singles
1999 songs
SME Records singles
Crystal Kay songs
Songs written by Yoko Kanno
Epic Records singles
J-pop songs